XHINS-FM is a radio station on 100.1 FM in Saltillo, Coahuila. The station is owned by the Instituto Tecnológico de Saltillo and is known as Radio Tec. Its permit expired in 2003, but the station remains on the air.

History
XHINS came to air on September 14, 1991, at noon. Manuel Flores Revuelta, the rector of the technological school, had considered a radio station in his first term as rector from 1983 to 1986; when he became rector again in 1991, work began to build the station.

References

Radio stations in Coahuila
Radio stations established in 1991
Mass media in Saltillo
Mexican radio stations with expired concessions